Elections to Armagh District Council were held on 20 May 1981 on the same day as the other Northern Irish local government elections. The election used four district electoral areas to elect a total of 20 councillors.

Election results

Note: "Votes" are the first preference votes.

Districts summary

|- class="unsortable" align="centre"
!rowspan=2 align="left"|Ward
! % 
!Cllrs
! % 
!Cllrs
! %
!Cllrs
! %
!Cllrs
! % 
!Cllrs
!rowspan=2|TotalCllrs
|- class="unsortable" align="center"
!colspan=2 bgcolor="" | UUP
!colspan=2 bgcolor="" | SDLP
!colspan=2 bgcolor="" | DUP
!colspan=2 bgcolor="" | UUUP
!colspan=2 bgcolor="white"| Others
|-
|align="left"|Area A
|bgcolor="40BFF5"|37.6
|bgcolor="40BFF5"|2
|33.3
|1
|27.2
|1
|1.8
|0
|0.0
|0
|4
|-
|align="left"|Area B
|bgcolor="40BFF5"|52.2
|bgcolor="40BFF5"|3
|16.2
|1
|22.5
|1
|9.2
|1
|0.0
|0
|6
|-
|align="left"|Area C
|25.3
|1
|bgcolor="#99FF66"|46.6
|bgcolor="#99FF66"|3
|12.6
|0
|0.0
|0
|15.5
|0
|5
|-
|align="left"|Area D
|32.3
|2
|bgcolor="#99FF66"|35.6
|bgcolor="#99FF66"|2
|11.7
|0
|0.0
|0
|20.4
|1
|5
|- class="unsortable" class="sortbottom" style="background:#C9C9C9"
|align="left"| Total
|38.7
|8
|30.8
|7
|18.5
|3
|3.6
|1
|8.4
|1
|20
|-
|}

Districts results

Area A

1977: 2 x UUP, 1 x SDLP, 1 x DUP
1981: 2 x UUP, 1 x SDLP, 1 x DUP
1977-1981 Change: No change

Area B

1977: 3 x UUP, 1 x DUP, 1 x SDLP, 1 x UUUP
1981: 3 x UUP, 1 x DUP, 1 x SDLP, 1 x UUUP
1977-1981 Change: No change

Area C

1977: 3 x SDLP, 2 x UUP
1981: 3 x SDLP, 1 x UUP, 1 x DUP
1977-1981 Change: DUP gain from UUP

Area D

1977: 2 x SDLP, 2 x UUP, 1 x Independent Nationalist
1981: 2 x SDLP, 2 x UUP, 1 x Independent Nationalist
1977-1981 Change: No change

References

Armagh City and District Council elections
Armagh